The Independence Cup is an annual friendly football tournament held in Albania on 28 November to commemorate Albanian Independence Day. The tournament took place in Vlorë between 2009 and 2015, in Tiranë in 2016 and in Korçë in 2017. Clubs from Albania, Kosovo, North Macedonia and Montenegro have taken part in the tournament.

Winners

Editions

2009

2010

2011

2012

2013

2014

2015

2016

2017

2018

Statistics

Performance by team

Performance by country

See also
Albanian Declaration of Independence

References

International association football competitions hosted by Albania
Recurring sporting events established in 2009
2009 establishments in Albania